Oryctina is a genus of flowering plants belonging to the family Loranthaceae.

Its native range is Brazil.

Species:

Oryctina eubrachioides 
Oryctina quadrangularis 
Oryctina scabrida 
Oryctina subaphylla

References

Loranthaceae
Loranthaceae genera